The Baseball5 European Championship is the main championship tournament between national Baseball5 teams in Europe, governed by the WBSC Europe. The top two teams qualified for Baseball5 World Cup.

Results

Medal table

See also
European Baseball Championship
ESF Women's Championship
European Cup (baseball)

References

Baseball5
International baseball5 competitions in Europe
Baseball5
Biennial sporting events
Recurring sporting events established in 2020
2020 establishments in Europe